Gladys Kuchta (16 June 1915 - 7 October 1998) was an American operatic soprano who sang leading roles in opera houses worldwide including the Vienna State Opera, Royal Opera House, Bayreuth Festival, San Francisco Opera, and the Teatro Colón.

Repertoire

Isolde Tristan und Isolde
Elektra, Chrysothemis Elektra
Amelia Un Ballo in Maschera
Brünnhilde Siegfried
Turandot Turandot
Leonore Fidelio
Aida Aida
Sieglinde, Brünnhilde Die Walküre
Brünnhilde Götterdämmerung
Lady Macbeth in Macbeth
Abigaille Nabucco
Elsa Lohengrin
Färberin Die Frau ohne Schatten
Giulietta Les Contes de Hoffmann
Senta Der Fliegende Holländer
Ursula Mathis der Maler
Elettra Idomeneo
Marie Wozzeck

References

1915 births
1998 deaths
American operatic sopranos
20th-century American women opera singers